Büyük ada ("big island" in Turkish) may refer to:

Büyükada
Büyük Ada - an island in the Karaburun town in Izmir